Recoleta is a commune of Chile located in the north of Santiago Province. It belongs to the  Santiago Metropolitan Region which is the capital and seat of the executive branch. It is south of Huechuraba, east of Independencia and Conchalí, west of Providencia and Vitacura, and north of Santiago. The Mapocho River and the San Cristóbal Hill form the natural boundary on the south and east sides, respectively, of Recoleta.

Demographics
The population fell by 10% (16547 persons) between the 1992 and 2002 censuses. It had a 2006 projected population of 136,982.

Stats
Average annual household income: US$45,513 (PPP, 2006)
Population below poverty line: 1.4% (2006)
Regional quality of life index: 89.77, high, 4 out of 52 (2005)
Human Development Index: 0.797, 11 out of 341 (2003)

Parks and open space 
The territory of Recoleta includes the northwest portion of Santiago Metropolitan Park, the Cerro Blanco and the Santiago General Cemetery.

Culture 
The bohemian Barrio Bellavista straddles the border between Recoleta and Providencia. Barrio Patronato is a commercial neighbourhood of Recoleta. The commune is the location of La Vega Central Market.

Historical churches are located in Recoleta, including the Iglesia de la Recoleta Franciscana and the Iglesia de la Recoleta Dominica.

Administration
As a commune, Recoleta is a third-level administrative division of Chile administered by a municipal council, headed by an alcalde that is directly elected every four years. The 2012-2016 and re-elected for 2016-2020 and 2021-2024 alcalde is Daniel Jadue Jadue (PC). The communal council has the following members:

 Fares Jadue Leiva (PC)
 Natalia Cuevas Guerrero (PC)
 Joceline Parra Delgadillo (PC)
 Cristian Weibel  Avendaño (PC)
 Karen Garrido Ganga (PC)
 José Salas San Juan (PS)
 Silvana Flores Cruz (PDC)
 Felipe Cruz Huanchicay (RN)

Within the electoral divisions of Chile, Recoleta is part of electoral district No. 9. On the other hand, the commune belongs to the VII Senatorial District that represents the entire Metropolitan Region of Santiago.

References

External links
  Municipality of Recoleta

 
Populated places in Santiago Province, Chile
Geography of Santiago, Chile
Communes of Chile
Populated places established in 1981